Lataxiena is a genus of sea snails, marine gastropod mollusks in the family Muricidae, the murex snails or rock snails.

Lataxiena lataxiena Jousseaume, 1883 is the type species by tautonomy (= Trophon fimbriatus Hinds, 1844).

Species
Species within the genus Lataxiena include:
 Lataxiena blosvillei (Deshayes, 1832)
 Lataxiena bombayana (Melvill, 1893)
 Lataxiena cumella (Jousseaume, 1898)
 Lataxiena desserti Houart, 1995
 Lataxiena fimbriata (Hinds, 1844)
 Lataxiena habropenos Houart, 1995
 Lataxiena lutescena Zhang & Zhang, 2014 
 Lataxiena solenosteiroides Houart, Fraussen & Barbier, 2013
Species brought into synonymy
 Lataxiena birileffi (Lischke, 1871): synonym of Bedevina birileffi (Lischke, 1871)
 Lataxiena elegans Jousseaume, 1883: synonym of Lataxiena fimbriata (Hinds, 1844)
 Lataxiena lataxiena Jousseaume, 1883: synonym of Lataxiena fimbriata (Hinds, 1844)
 Lataxiena mixta Houart, 1995: synonym of Orania mixta Houart, 1995
 Lataxiena taiwanica Shikama, 1978: synonym of Indothais sacellum (Gmelin, 1791)

References

 Houart R., Fraussen K. & Barbier J.P. (2013) Description of a new species of Lataxiena (Gastropoda: Muricidae) from India. Gloria Maris 52(1-2): 1-10.

External links
 Jousseaume F. (1883). Description d'espèces et genres nouveaux de mollusques. Bulletin de la Société Zoologique de France. 8: 186-204, pl. 10

 
Gastropod genera